The 1966–67 Polska Liga Hokejowa season was the 32nd season of the Polska Liga Hokejowa, the top level of ice hockey in Poland. 10 teams participated in the league, and Legia Warszawa won the championship.

Final round

Qualification round

External links
 Season on hockeyarchives.info

Polska
Polska Hokej Liga seasons
1966–67 in Polish ice hockey